Umnov (from умный meaning smart) is a Russian masculine surname, its feminine counterpart is Umnova. Notable people with the surname include:

Olga Umnova, Russian-British scientist
Valeri Umnov (born 1974), Russian football player

Russian-language surnames